Estevelles is a commune in the Pas-de-Calais department in the Hauts-de-France region of France.

Geography
The canalised river Deûle forms the southern boundary of the commune.

Population

Places of interest
 The church of Notre-Dame, rebuilt, as was most of the village, after the First World War.
 The war memorial.

See also
Communes of the Pas-de-Calais department

References

External links

 Commune website 
 Website of the Communaupole de Lens-Liévin 

Communes of Pas-de-Calais
French Flanders